Habban may be: 
Habban, Yemen
Wahidi Habban
Habban, homeland of the Late Bronze Age Kassites
Habbān, a bagpipe